ISO/IEC 27018 is a security standard part of the ISO/IEC 27000 family of standards. It was the first international standard about the privacy in cloud computing services which was promoted by the industry. It was created in 2014 as an addendum to ISO/IEC 27001, the first international code of practice for cloud privacy. It helps cloud service providers who process personally identifiable information (PII) to assess risk and implement controls for protecting PII. It was published by the International Organization for Standardization (ISO) and the International Electrotechnical Commission (IEC) under the joint ISO and IEC subcommittee, ISO/IEC JTC 1/SC 27.

Standard Versions
That standard has two versions:

 ISO/IEC 27018:2014
 ISO/IEC 27018:2019

Structure of the standard
The official title of the standard is "Information technology — Security techniques — Code of practice for protection of personally identifiable information (PII) in public clouds acting as PII processors".
ISO/IEC 27018:2019 has eighteen sections, plus a long annex, which cover:
1. Scope
2. Normative References
3. Terms and definitions
4. Overview
5. Information security policies
6. Organization of information security
7. Human resource security
8. Asset management
9. Access control
10. Cryptography
11. Physical and environmental security
12. Operations security
13. Communications security
14. System acquisition, development and maintenance
15. Supplier relationships
16. Information security incident management
17. Information security aspects of business continuity management
18. Compliance

Objectives
The objective of this document, when used in conjunction with the information security objectives and controls in ISO/IEC 27002, is to create a common set of security categories and controls that can be implemented by a public cloud computing service provider acting as a PII processor. It has the following objectives:

 Help the public cloud service provider to comply with applicable obligations when acting as a PII processor, whether such obligations fall on the PII processor directly or through contract.
 Enable the public cloud PII processor to be transparent in relevant matters so that cloud service customers can select well-governed cloud-based PII processing services.
 Assist the cloud service customer and the public cloud PII processor in entering into a contractual agreement.
 Provide cloud service customers with a mechanism for exercising audit and compliance rights and responsibilities in cases where individual cloud service customer audits of data hosted in a multiparty, virtualized server (cloud) environment can be impractical technically and can increase risks to those physical and logical network security controls in place.

Advantages
Using this standard has the following advantages:

 It provides a higher security to customer data and information.
 It makes the platform more reliable to the customer, achieving a higher level than the competition.
 Faster enablement of global operations.
 Streamlined contracts.
 It provides legal protections for cloud providers and users.

References

External links
 ISO Website

Computer security standards
Information assurance standards
27018